

Protected areas of Poland include the following categories, as defined by the Act on Protection of Nature of 16 April 2004, by the Polish Parliament:

National parks

There are 23 national parks in Poland. These were formerly run by the Polish Board of National Parks (Krajowy Zarząd Parków Narodowych), but in 2004 responsibility for them was transferred to the Ministry of the Environment. Most national parks are divided into strictly and partially protected zones. Additionally, they are usually surrounded by a protective buffer zone called otulina.

Landscape parks

According to the Act on Protection of Nature (Ustawa o ochronie przyrody) of 2004, a Landscape Park (Parki Krajobrazowe) is defined as "an area protected because of its natural, historical, cultural and scenic values, for the purpose of conserving and popularizing those values in conditions of balanced development."

Nature reserves

As of 2011, Poland has 1469 nature reserves. The Nature reserves in Poland are divided into categories: fauna (141), landscape (108), forest (722), peat-bog (177), flora (169), water (44), inanimate nature (72), steppe (32) and halophyte (4). Another division is into the regular and strict nature reserves; the strict ones see no human activity, whereas the regular one see limited maintenance.

Protected areas
Protected landscape areas belong to some of the least restrictive zones of protection, with focus on qualified tourism and outdoor recreation.

Natura 2000 designated areas
About 500 Natura 2000 sites, ecological network of protected areas in the territory of the European Union including:
 72 Special Protection Areas  (OSOP) locations to safeguard the habitats of migratory birds and certain particularly threatened birds.

Site of Community Importance locations that contribute significantly to the maintenance or restoration at a favorable conservation status of a natural habitat type.
Special Area of Conservation (SOOS)

Other designated sites
 Geological "documentary sites"
 Over 6,000 "ecological sites"
 "Nature and landscape complexes"
 About 33,000 natural monuments (mainly trees, also some caves etc.)

Poland also has the following internationally designated sites:

Biosphere Reserves

UNESCO Biosphere Reserves are environment-protected scientific-research institutions of international status that are created with the intent for conservation in a natural state the most typical natural complexes of biosphere, conducting background ecological monitoring, studying of the surrounding natural environment, its changes under the activity of anthropogenic factors.

Biosphere Preserves are created on the base of nature preserves or national parks including to their composition territories and objects of other categories of nature-preserving fund and other lands as well as including in the established order the World Network of Biosphere Reserves in the UNESCO framework "Man and the Biosphere Programme". There are 9 Biosphere Reserves in Poland.

World Heritage Sites

A UNESCO World Heritage Site is a place (such as a forest, mountain, lake, island, desert, monument, building, complex, or city) that is listed by UNESCO as sites of outstanding cultural or natural importance to the common heritage of humanity. There are fourteen World Heritage Sites in Poland (1 Natural and
13 Cultural). The first two sites were inscribed on the World Heritage List in 1978. Three of the sites, Belovezhskaya Pushcha / Białowieża Forest, Wooden Tserkvas of Carpathian Region in Poland and Ukraine and Muskauer Park / Park Mużakowski are shared with neighboring countries (Belarus, Ukraine and Germany). Poland also has six sites on the Tentative List.

Ramsar Convention sites

The Ramsar Convention on Wetlands is an international treaty for the conservation and sustainable utilization of wetlands, i.e., to stem the progressive encroachment on and loss of wetlands now and in the future, recognizing the fundamental ecological functions of wetlands and their economic, cultural, scientific, and recreational value.

References

Notes

 
Poland